Fujian Free-Trade Zone (Fujian FTZ, colloquially known as 福建自由贸易区/福建自贸区 in Chinese), officially China (Fujian) Pilot Free-Trade Zone is a free-trade zone in Fujian province, China. The mainland free-trade zone is the nearest to Taiwan. The zone covers an area of 118.04 square kilometres and integrates three existing bonded zones in three areas — Pingtan Subdistrict (43 square kilometres), Fuzhou Subdistrict (31.26 square kilometres) and Xiamen Subdistrict (43.78 square kilometres). Fujian FTZ was founded in Mawei District, Fuzhou on 21 April 2015.

See also
Economic Cooperation Framework Agreement
Cross-Strait Service Trade Agreement

References

External links

Fuzhou Subdistrict
Xiamen Subdistrict 
Pingtan Subdistrict

Special Economic Zones of China
Economy of Fujian
2015 establishments in China